Jägala-Joa is a village in Jõelähtme Parish, Harju County in northern Estonia. It's lies on the right bank of the Jägala River.

Gallery

References

 

Villages in Harju County